Lytsewierrum  is a small village in Súdwest-Fryslân municipality in the province of Friesland, the Netherlands. It had a population of around 68 in January 2017.

History
The village was first mentioned in 1381 as Liticawerum, and means "little terp". Lytsewierrum is a terp (artificial living hill) village on the eastern tip of the former island of Easterein.

The Dutch Reformed church dates burnt down in 1514 and rebuilt in 1557 and has colourful paintings on the ceiling in Art Deco style. The tower dates from the 15th century.

Lytsewierrum was home to 167 people in 1840. The village is located at a dead-end road (for cars), because Cornelis Rimmerts Faber, the grietman (predecessor of mayor) of Hennaarderadeel did not want a road through his lands. Before 2018, the village was part of the Littenseradiel municipality and before 1984 it belonged to Hennaarderadeel municipality.

Gallery

References

External links

Súdwest-Fryslân
Populated places in Friesland